Tomi-Pekka Heikkilä (born 12 April 1990) is a Finnish sport shooter.

He participated at the 2018 ISSF World Shooting Championships, winning a medal.

References

External links

Living people
1990 births
Finnish male sport shooters
Running target shooters
People from Kangasala
Sportspeople from Pirkanmaa